William Franklin "Roy" Weir (February 25, 1911 – September 30, 1989) was a Major League Baseball pitcher. He pitched parts of four seasons for the Boston Bees from 1936 until 1939.

During World War II, Wier served in the navy as a gunnery officer. He later had a career with New England Telephone and Illinois Bell.

Born in Portland, Maine, Wier died in Anaheim, California, aged 78.

References

External links

Major League Baseball pitchers
Boston Bees players
Hartford Laurels players
Toronto Maple Leafs (International League) players
Baseball players from Maine
1911 births
1989 deaths
Sportspeople from Portland, Maine
United States Navy personnel of World War II
Holderness School alumni